Andy Laverne Plays the Music of Chick Corea is an album by pianist Andy LaVerne recorded in 1986 (with one track from 1981) and released on the Jazzline label.

Reception 

Paul Kohler of AllMusic called it "A beautifully executed album".

Track listing 
All compositions by Chick Corea except where noted.

 "Chick Corea" (Andy LaVerne) – 5:00
 "Bill Evans" – 3:17
 "Cornucopia" – 4:56
 "Turnaround" – 5:45
 "Folk Song" – 6:48
 "Psalm" – 3:43
 "Ghost of Triengen" – 4:51
 "Softly as You Go" – 3:26
 "Like This" – 4:15
 "Romans (Written for John McLaughlin)" – 2:58
 "Heart to Heart" (Chick Corea, Andy LaVerne) – 5:50
 "You're Everything" – 4:56
 "Blues for Liebestraum" – 3:30

Personnel 
Andy LaVerne – Grand piano, synclavier, Hammond B3 organ
John Abercrombie – electric guitar, acoustic guitar
Marc Johnson – bass (tracks 1, 2, 5, 6, 12 & 13)
Mark Egan – electric bass (tracks 3, 4 & 7–9)
Danny Gottlieb – drums
Chick Corea – Bösendorfer grand piano (track 11)

References 

Andy LaVerne albums
1986 albums
Chick Corea tribute albums